Stephen James Bates (born 23 November 1992) is an Australian politician who is a member of the Australian Greens, and was elected as the member for the Division of Brisbane in the 2022 Australian federal election, defeating sitting Liberal member and former National Retail Association CEO Trevor Evans.

Early life and education
Bates was born in Croydon, South London; his family moved to Australia during the financial crisis of 2007–2008, settling in the central Queensland town of Yeppoon.

Bates studied at the University of Queensland, originally for a Bachelor of International Hotel and Tourism Management. While studying, he went to the United States to pursue a work opportunity. Bates has stated that his experience in the United States is what convinced him to enter politics, specifically his encountering of a coworker crying over whether to buy insulin or pay her rent.

When Bates moved back to Australia he changed his degree to a Bachelor of Social Science with a major in social and public policy, and graduated under that degree. Prior to being elected, Bates was a retail employee and a member of the Retail and Fast Food Workers Union.

Political career
Bates was the nominee of the Australian Greens for the Division of Brisbane in the 2022 Australian federal election, defeating incumbent MP Trevor Evans. Bates' campaign was noted for its use of geo-located Grindr advertisements with risqué slogans, such as promoting that "the best parliaments are hung". In an interview with radio station B105 FM, Bates credited the ads as a vital component of his election victory.

Personal life
Bates is openly gay.

References

1992 births
Living people
Australian Greens members of the Parliament of Australia
Members of the Australian House of Representatives
Members of the Australian House of Representatives for Brisbane
LGBT legislators in Australia
Gay politicians
People from Brisbane
Politicians from London
Australian trade unionists
21st-century Australian politicians